David "Dave" Allan Wilson (born 1970) is a Canadian politician and member of the Nova Scotia House of Assembly, representing the riding of Sackville-Cobequid for the Nova Scotia New Democratic Party. He was first elected in the 2003 election when veteran MLA John Holm did not re-offer. Wilson was re-elected in the 2006, 2009, 2013 and 2017 elections.

Wilson stepped down as the MLA for Sackville-Cobequid on November 16, 2018 stating, "It's just time for me to look at other things".

Early life
Prior to his election, Wilson was a paramedic in the community of Sackville for almost eight years. He was educated at Sackville High School and Saint Mary's University. He also received his Diploma as an Emergency Medical Technician at the School of Allied Health - School of Emergency Health Services at the VG Hospital, Halifax.

He volunteered as a firefighter with HRM Fire and Emergency Services and the Sackville Fire Department, where he has held several key executive positions including vice-chairman of the department.

Member of the Legislative Assembly

Role in Opposition
From 2005 to 2008, while in opposition, Wilson performed the critic roles for Heritage and Culture, Tourism, Heritage Act, and Housing and Communications until August 2005, when he was named the critic for Health.

Introduction of Bills 
Wilson introduced several bills while in opposition, including amendments to the Motor Vehicle Act  which would require drivers on highways without a median barrier to slow to 50 km/hr when passing a motor vehicle accident where authorities are present, the Health Protection Act which would require the Minister of Health to develop a pre-surgery care program for each district health authorities, and the Volunteer Services Act which suggested that ‘good Samaritans rendering service or assistance under this Act are not responsible for the payment of fees associated with rendering that service or assistance.’ Each of these bills was blocked by the Conservative government at the time and did not escalate past the 1st reading.

Member of the Executive Council of Nova Scotia
On January 11, 2011, Wilson was appointed to the Executive Council of Nova Scotia as Minister of a newly amalgamated Department of Communities, Culture and Heritage.

As Minister, Wilson released Nova Scotia's first strategic Arts and Culture 5-Year plan.

On March 27, 2012, Wilson appointed members to the first Arts Nova Scotia board. The board is composed of eleven Nova Scotians from across the arts sector and is part of the province's five-point plan on arts and culture released in February 2011. Nine years prior, a similar group existed under the Conservative government, however it was dismantled, stating that the move would cut administrative costs and artists would receive the money directly.
 
On May 30, 2012, Premier Darrell Dexter shuffled his cabinet, moving Maureen MacDonald to the Finance portfolio, making way for Wilson to take over as Minister of Health and Minister of Acadian Affairs.

Return to Opposition
Wilson was re-elected in the 2013 election, but returned to opposition as the New Democrats finished third. On June 7, 2015, Wilson announced his intention to seek the leadership of the NS NDP at the party's 2016 leadership convention. On February 27, 2016, Wilson was defeated in his bid for the leadership, finishing third on the first ballot.

Wilson was re-elected in the 2017 election.

Electoral record

|-

|New Democratic Party
|Dave Wilson
|align="right"|2,983
|align="right"|38.45
|align="right"|-26.89
|-

|Liberal
|Graham Cameron
|align="right"|2,898
|align="right"|37.35
|align="right"|+17.60  
|-
 
|Progressive Conservative
|Peter MacIsaac
|align="right"|1,651
|align="right"|21.28
|align="right"|+8.82 
|-

|}

|-

|New Democratic Party
|Dave Wilson
|align="right"|5120
|align="right"|65.34
|align="right"|
|-

|Liberal
|Scott Hemming
|align="right"|1548
|align="right"|19.75
|align="right"|
|-
 
|Progressive Conservative
|Jessica Alexander
|align="right"|976
|align="right"|12.46
|align="right"|
|-

|}

|-

|New Democratic Party
|Dave Wilson
|align="right"|4475
|align="right"|54.50
|align="right"|
|-
 
|Progressive Conservative
|Steve Craig
|align="right"|2499
|align="right"|30.42
|align="right"|
|-

|Liberal
|David Major
|align="right"|1055
|align="right"|12.80
|align="right"|
|-

|}

|-

|New Democratic Party
|Dave Wilson
|align="right"|3881
|align="right"|45.22
|align="right"|
|-
 
|Progressive Conservative
|John Giannakos
|align="right"|2426
|align="right"|28.43
|align="right"|
|-

|Liberal
|Bob Harvey
|align="right"|2147
|align="right"|25.23
|align="right"|
|-

|}

References

External links
 Members of the Nova Scotia Legislative Assembly
 Dave Wilson's NSNDP profile

1970 births
Anglophone Quebec people
Nova Scotia New Democratic Party MLAs
Living people
People from Alma, Quebec
Members of the Executive Council of Nova Scotia
Nova Scotia Ministers of Health
Saint Mary's University (Halifax) alumni
21st-century Canadian politicians
Paramedics